Dizaj-e Naqaleh (also Romanized as Dīzaj-e Naqāleh; also known as Dīzaj-e Taqāleh) is a village in Bakeshluchay Rural District, in the Central District of Urmia County, West Azerbaijan Province, Iran. At the 2006 census, its population was 22, in 6 families.

References 

Populated places in Urmia County